Southside/Newington is one of the seventeen wards used to elect members of the City of Edinburgh Council. Established in 2007 along with the other wards, it elects four Councillors. As its name suggests, the ward's territory to the south-east of the city centre is based around the communities of Newington and the South Side (defined as the area south of Drummond Street between the Meadows and Salisbury Crags, bisected by Clerk Street), also including Blackford, Cameron Toll, The Grange, Mayfield, Prestonfield and Sciennes.

A minor 2017 boundary change saw the loss of Dumbiedykes in the north of the ward and the addition of Nether Liberton village in the south. In 2019, the ward had a population of 37,696.

Councillors

Election results

2022 election
2022 City of Edinburgh Council election

2017 election
2017 City of Edinburgh Council election

2012 election
2012 City of Edinburgh Council election

  

 

                                              

On 1 March 2014, SNP councillor Jim Orr resigned from the party and became an Independent citing disillusionment with internal political spats. He retired prior to the next election.

2007 election
2007 City of Edinburgh Council election

References

External links
Listed Buildings in Southside/Newington Ward, City of Edinburgh at British Listed Buildings

Wards of Edinburgh